Eleonora Goldoni (born 16 February 1996) is an Italian professional footballer who plays as a forward for Sassuolo in the Serie A and has appeared for the Italy women's national team.

Club career 
On 5 July 2022, Goldoni joined Sassuolo.

International career 
Goldoni has been capped for the Italy national team, appearing for the team during the 2019 FIFA Women's World Cup qualifying cycle.

Career statistics

Club

References

External links
 
 
 

1996 births
Living people
Italian women's footballers
Italy women's international footballers
Women's association football forwards
East Tennessee State Buccaneers women's soccer players
Competitors at the 2019 Summer Universiade
Inter Milan (women) players
Serie A (women's football) players
S.S.D. Napoli Femminile players
U.S. Sassuolo Calcio (women) players
People from Finale Emilia